Liberty Baptist School, formerly United Baptist, was established in September 1968, in San Jose, California, consisting of ten pupils with Mrs. Cherie Noel as principal and teacher.  Liberty Baptist School is accredited by the Western Association of Schools and Colleges and the American Association of Christian Schools.

History 

On March 10, 1968, the United Baptist Church voted to purchase classrooms of McKinley School, which had been condemned for a freeway in the amount of $6,300. The building was worth about $150,000 new and was eight years old at the time of the purchase. On June 9, 1968, the church voted to authorize the formation of a Christian Day School beginning with a kindergarten in September 1968.

Cherie Noel was the first principal and teacher of the United Baptist School in 1968. Additional buildings were purchased to make room for more classroom space for the growing church and school ministries. The school grew to over one hundred students in 1969 and began to include kindergarten through sixth grade.

In 1971, Liberty Christian High School was added, and the school became Liberty Christian Schools in 1977. The name was changed to Liberty Baptist School in September 1980.
Liberty Baptist School currently operates as a ministry of the Liberty Baptist Church under the leadership of Stan Smith as the pastor of the church and Russell Barnes as the principal and administrator of the school.

Mission Statement 

The Mission statement of the Liberty Baptist School is as follows:"The mission of Liberty Baptist School is to prepare students to serve the Lord Jesus Christ by equipping them with spiritual, academic, and leadership tools necessary to be "light" and "salt" in this present world (Matthew 5:13-16)."

Liberty Baptist School maintains that the Bible is the final authority (and standard) for every matter of "faith and practice." This means that other textbooks (science, math, history, language, etc.) are considered to be supplements to the Bible and are evaluated by their adherence to the principles contained in the Bible and that the conduct, attitude, speech, and achievement of every student and faculty member of Liberty Baptist School is evaluated according to the principles of the Bible.

The Liberty Baptist School trains young people in the principles of leadership, character, self-discipline, responsibility, integrity, and good citizenship according to Christian values. Liberty Baptist School admits students from non-Christian families on a space-available basis.

The program of Liberty Baptist School emphasizes:
A scripture-based program of Christian character training and discipline.
A consistent presentation of the gospel of Jesus Christ, in order for every student to know Jesus as Lord and Savior and embrace a lifestyle consistent with scriptural truth.
A love for and loyalty toward America and the Biblical principles upon which America had incorporated in its founding.
An academic college preparatory education.
A fine arts program designed to assist each student to develop his or her special talents in relation to the glory of the Lord, and to appreciate music, art, and other fine arts disciplines that glorify God.
A physical education program that stresses physical fitness, teamwork, and a Christian attitude in every sports and athletic endeavor.

The Expected Learning Results 

Liberty Baptist School intends that all students would meet the following criteria:
E- Effective Communicators, who can demonstrate a high level of written and verbal skills necessary for working effectively.
A- Academic Achievers, who are able to pursue their college and career goals.
G- Godly in Character, demonstrated by a recognition of God as the Creator, the Author of truth, and the development of a Christian worldview.
L- Leaders, who are problem solvers, with moral strength, discernment, and responsible citizenship built around a Christian worldview.
E- Extracurricular Minded, who contribute their time, energy, and talents to improve the quality of life in our school and community, and respond to the needs of others.

Music Program 

Liberty Baptist offers musical instruction at the elementary and secondary levels. Students begin learning instruments and receive vocal instruction at an early age. Students also perform in public settings throughout the year and also host various concerts at the school.

School music groups are featured annually in Downtown San Jose, California, at Christmas in the Park, and various other venues. Since Liberty Baptist School is a member of the Golden State Association of Christian Schools and the American Association of Christian Schools, students are able to compete in various fine arts competitions.

Athletics 

The mascot of the Liberty Baptist School is the Eagle.
, the school offers physical education at the elementary and secondary grade levels. Also, students may compete in ladies' volleyball, ladies' and men's basketball, and ladies' softball.

Students compete with other schools in the Pacific School Athletic League

References

External links 
http://libertybaptistschool.org

High schools in San Jose, California
Private K-12 schools in California
Educational institutions established in 1968
1968 establishments in California